The 2007–08 season was Colchester United's 66th season in their history and their second successive season in the second tier of English football, the Championship. Alongside competing in the Championship, the club also participated in the FA Cup and League Cup.

Colchester struggled during their second season in the Championship, suffering long spells without wins. The early stages of the season were promising, with the U's featuring in mid-table, but a drop in form leading into December saw them enter the relegation zone from which they would never emerge. They earned just seven wins and were relegated in 24th and last place. They never recovered from selling their midfield and defensive assets, despite owner and now chairman Robbie Cowling freeing up funds for manager Geraint Williams in January.

It was a farewell season to the club's aging Layer Road ground as they were to move to the purpose-built Colchester Community Stadium in the summer of 2008.

The U's suffered an early exit from the cup competitions to League Two opposition. Shrewsbury Town knocked Colchester out of the League Cup while Peterborough United beat them 3–1 at Layer Road in the FA Cup.

Season overview
Ahead of Colchester's largely unexpected second season in the Championship, their star performers Wayne Brown, Jamie Cureton, Richard Garcia, and Chris Iwelumo all left the club citing a "lack of ambition" as their reason for wanting to leave. Cureton left for Norwich City for £750,000, prompting manager Geraint Williams to break the club's record transfer fee twice on the same day by signing Mark Yeates from Tottenham Hotspur and then spending £300,000 on Milton Keynes Dons' forward Clive Platt. The following day, England legend Teddy Sheringham also signed for the club.

Over the summer, Robbie Cowling took over as chairman from Peter Heard, who stepped down after 16 years to become Life President. Cowling instigated a major change at the club by reverting Heard's previous attitude towards not using agents, admitting that if Colchester were to compete then they would have to use agents.

Once a fortress in their first season in the Championship, Layer Road faced its final season hosting Colchester United. Unfortunately, Colchester could muster only four home wins across the season, with their final Layer Road win a 2–0 victory over neighbours Ipswich Town. One of the reasons for the U's struggling was the lack of replacement for Wayne Brown in the centre of defence. While they kept up a good scoring record through Platt and fellow new signing Kevin Lisbie, the defence leaked goals, conceding 86 in the league. Despite early season promise with the U's hovering around mid-table, by Christmas it was apparent they were in a relegation battle.

In the January transfer window, Cowling made funds available to Geraint Williams. He brought in Chris Coyne from Luton Town for another club record fee of £350,000, while Dean Hammond and Philip Ifil were also brought in for six-figure fees. There was a brief turnaround in form in January and early February, but a ten game run without a win including five consecutive defeats left the writing on the wall for the U's.

Colchester could have been relegated from the Championship on 5 April, but the 2–0 win over rivals Ipswich ensured that the U's neighbours would not be the team relegating them. However, the inevitable occurred four days later when, without playing, relegation was confirmed when results went against them. In addition to conceding 86 goals, they kept a clean sheet on just two occasions all season.

On 26 April, Layer Road hosted its final competitive game, just over 70 years since its first. With the move to the Colchester Community Stadium looming in the summer, Colchester played their final home game against Premier League-bound Stoke City, who were 1–0 victors on the day. In spite of the relegation and lowly league position, it was still Colchester's second-best-ever league performance.

Players

Transfers

In

 Total spending:  ~ £900,000

Out

 Total incoming:  ~ £1,750,000

Loans in

Loans out

Match details

Championship

League table

Results round by round

Matches

Football League Cup

FA Cup

Squad statistics

Appearances and goals

|-
!colspan="16"|Players who appeared for Colchester who left during the season

|}

Goalscorers

Disciplinary record

Clean sheets
Number of games goalkeepers kept a clean sheet.

Player debuts
Players making their first-team Colchester United debut in a fully competitive match.

See also
List of Colchester United F.C. seasons

References

General
Books

Websites

Specific

2007-08
2007–08 Football League Championship by team